Kristina is a feminine given name. Notable people and characters with the name include:

People
the Swedish name of Christina of Sweden
Kristina (born 1987), Slovak singer
Kristina Adolphson (born 1937), Swedish actress
Kristina Apgar (born 1985), American actress
Kristina Bach (born 1962), German singer and music producer 
Kristina Bakarandze (born 1998), Georgia-born Azerbaijani footballer
Kristina Bannikova (born 1991), Estonian footballer
Kristina Barrois (born 1981), German tennis player
Kristina Benić (born 1988), Croatian basketball player
Kristina Boden, American film and television editor
Kristina Brenk (1911–2009), Slovene author
Kristina Carlson (born 1949), Finnish author
Kristina Clonan (born 1998), Australian cyclist
Kristina Dovydaitytė (born 1985), Lithuanian badminton player
Kristina Dörfer (born 1984), German singer and actress
Kristina Đukić (2000–2021), Serbian YouTuber and streamer
Kristina Elez (born 1987), Croatian handball player
Kristina Erman (born 1993), Slovene footballer
Kristina Fialová, Czech violist
Kristína Gavnholt (born 1988), Czech badminton player
Kristina Fries (born 1962), Swedish sport shooter
Kristina Georgieva (born 1992), Bulgarian beauty pageant contestant
Kristina Gorshkova (born 1989), Russian ice dancer
Kristina Graovac (born 1991), Serbian handball player
Kristina Groves (born 1976), Canadian speed skater
Kristina Halvorson, American author and speaker known for her expertise in website content strategy
Kristina Hillmann, German hockey player
Kristina Hooper Woolsey, American scientist
Kristina Janolo (born 1987), American beauty pageant
Kristina M. Johnson (born 1957), American business executive, engineer, academic, and former government official, and Chancellor-elect of the State University of New York
Kristina Kanders (born 1962), German drummer, composer and singer
Kristina Karamo, American far-right politician
Kristina Keneally (born 1968), Australian politician
Kristina Klebe (born 1979), American actress
Kristina Kovač (born 1974), Serbian singer and composer
Kristina Krepela (born 1979), Croatian actress
 Kristina Kristiansen (born 1989), Danish handball player
Kristina Kunkel (born 1984), American water polo player
 Kristina Larsen (rower) (born 1978), Australian rower
 Kristina Larsen (soccer) (born 1988), American professional soccer player
Kristina Lennox-Silva (born 1985), Puerto Rican swimmer
Kristina Lum (born 1976), American swimmer
Kristina Lundberg (born 1985), Swedish hockey player
Kristina McMorris, American author
Kristina Miltiadou (born 1989), Greek-Australian singer-songwriter 
Kristina Mladenovic (born 1993), French tennis player
Kristina Moore, Jersey politician and journalist
Kristina Mundt (born 1966), German rower
Kristina Nedopekina (born 1989), Kazakhstani handball player
Kristina Nilsdotter (died 1254), Swedish noblewoman
Kristina Nilsson (born 1965), Swedish politician
Kristina Ohlsson (born 1979), Swedish scientist
Kristina Persson (born 1945), Swedish politician
Kristina Plahinek (born 1992), Croatian handball player
Kristina Poplavskaja (born 1972), Lithuanian rower
Kristina Prkačin (born 1997), Croatian handball player
Kristina Rangelova (born 1985), Bulgarian gymnast
Kristina Reed, American film producer
Kristina Reynolds (born 1984), German field hockey player
Kristina Richter (born 1946), East German handball player
Kristina Saltanovič (born 1975), Lithuanian race walker
Kristina Sandberg (born 1971), Swedish novelist
Kristina Schröder (born 1977), German politician
Kristina Sisco (born 1982), American actress
Kristina Šmigun-Vähi (born 1977), Estonian cross-country skier
Kristina Šundov (born 1986), Croatian footballer
Kristina Timofeeva (born 1993), Russian archer
Kristina Torbergsen (born 1987), Norwegian politician
Kristina Tučkutė (born 1983), Lithuanian fashion model
Kristina Vengrytė (born 1981), Lithuanian basketball player
Kristina Winberg (born 1965), Swedish politician
Bobbi Kristina Brown (1993–2015), American reality television personality and singer
Kristinia DeBarge (born 1990), American singer-songwriter
Maria Kristina Kiellström (1744–1789), Swedish silk manufacturer
Kristiina Wegelius (born 1960), Finnish figure skater
Krystsina Tsimanouskaya, Belarusian Olympic athlete and refugee now living in Poland.

Fictional characters
Kristina Davis, character in the TV show General Hospital

See also
Kristina från Duvemåla, musical by Benny Andersson and Björn Ulvaeus
Christina (disambiguation)
Cristina (disambiguation)

Feminine given names

lv:Kristīna
pt:Kristina
ru:Кристина
sk:Kristína
sl:Kristina
fi:Kristiina (nimi)
sv:Kristina